Setazindol is an anorectic. It was never marketed.

References 

Secondary alcohols
Amines
Anorectics
Stimulants
Chlorobenzenes
Abandoned drugs